Naguib G. Sinarimbo (born January 31, 1972 in Pigcawayan, Cotabato) is a Filipino lawyer and politician who serves as the Local Government Minister of Bangsamoro.

Prior to the establishment of the Bangsamoro region, Sinarimbo served as consultant and resource person for the Philippine national government, armed non-state organizations, and non-governmental organizations. He was part of the Legal and Technical Working Group of the MILF Peace Panel which was involved in Philippine national government's peace negotiations with the Moro Islamic Liberation Front (MILF). He also aided in the creation of a draft for the Bangsamoro Organic Law as well as the transition of the MILF into a non-armed advocacy group through helping them setting up the United Bangsamoro Justice Party. Sinarimbo became the party's secretary general.

Sinarimbo was appointed as the first minister of the Ministry of the Interior and Local Government on February 26, 2019 by interim Bangsamoro Chief Minister Murad Ebrahim. As local government minister, he has overseen the putting up of municipal government buildings and police stations in various towns in the region. He is also involved in organizing Bangsamoro's Rapid Emergency Action on Disaster Incidence.

References
 

 

1972 births 
21st-century Filipino politicians
21st-century Filipino lawyers
People from Cotabato
Living people